George Gilmour Clissold (12 September 1899 – 19 August 1956) was an Australian rules footballer who played with Footscray in the Victorian Football League (VFL).

Notes

External links 

1899 births
1956 deaths
Australian rules footballers from Melbourne
Western Bulldogs players
Australian military personnel of World War I
People from Ascot Vale, Victoria
Military personnel from Melbourne